The International Journal of Medicinal Mushrooms publishes original research articles and critical reviews on a broad range of subjects pertaining to medicinal mushrooms, including systematics, nomenclature, taxonomy, morphology, medicinal value, biotechnology, and more. The journal started publishing in 1999.

The journal exhibited unusual levels of self-citation and its journal impact factor of 2019 was suspended from Journal Citation Reports in 2020, a sanction which hit 34 journals in total.

References

Mycology journals
Pharmacology journals
Begell House academic journals